"Is This Love?" is Bonnie Pink's second digital single in 2010. The single was released under the Warner Music Japan label on May 5, 2010.

Track listing

2010 singles
2010 songs
Bonnie Pink songs
Warner Music Japan singles
Songs written by Bonnie Pink